The 1998 The Bud at The Glen was the 20th stock car race of the 1998 NASCAR Winston Cup Series season and the 17th iteration of the event. The race was held on Sunday, August 9, 1998, at the shortened layout of Watkins Glen International, a 2.45 miles (3.943 km) permanent road course layout. The race took the scheduled 90 laps to complete. Within the closing laps of the race, Hendrick Motorsports driver Jeff Gordon would make a late race charge and pass for the lead with four to go to win his 36th career NASCAR Winston Cup Series victory, his seventh of the season, and his third consecutive victory up to that point. To fill out the podium, Roush Racing driver Mark Martin and Richard Childress Racing driver Mike Skinner would finish second and third, respectively.

Background 

Watkins Glen International (nicknamed "The Glen") is an automobile race track located in Watkins Glen, New York at the southern tip of Seneca Lake. It was long known around the world as the home of the Formula One United States Grand Prix, which it hosted for twenty consecutive years (1961–1980), but the site has been home to road racing of nearly every class, including the World Sportscar Championship, Trans-Am, Can-Am, NASCAR Sprint Cup Series, the International Motor Sports Association and the IndyCar Series.

Initially, public roads in the village were used for the race course. In 1956 a permanent circuit for the race was built. In 1968 the race was extended to six hours, becoming the 6 Hours of Watkins Glen. The circuit's current layout has more or less been the same since 1971, although a chicane was installed at the uphill Esses in 1975 to slow cars through these corners, where there was a fatality during practice at the 1973 United States Grand Prix. The chicane was removed in 1985, but another chicane called the "Inner Loop" was installed in 1992 after J.D. McDuffie's fatal accident during the previous year's NASCAR Winston Cup event.

The circuit is known as the Mecca of North American road racing and is a very popular venue among fans and drivers. The facility is currently owned by International Speedway Corporation.

Entry list 

 (R) denotes rookie driver.

Practice

First practice 
The first practice session was held on Friday, August 7, at 9:30 AM EST. The session would last for three hours and 30 minutes.

Final practice 
The final practice session, sometimes referred to as Happy Hour, was held on Saturday, August 8, at 2:15 PM EST. The session would last for one hour.

Qualifying 
Qualifying was split into two rounds. The first round was held on Friday, August 7, at 2:00 PM EST. Each driver would have one lap to set a time. During the first round, the top 25 drivers in the round would be guaranteed a starting spot in the race. If a driver was not able to guarantee a spot in the first round, they had the option to scrub their time from the first round and try and run a faster lap time in a second round qualifying run, held on Saturday, August 8, at 10:45 AM EST. As with the first round, each driver would have one lap to set a time. On January 24, 1998, NASCAR would announce that the amount of provisionals given would be increased from last season. Positions 26-36 would be decided on time, while positions 37-43 would be based on provisionals. Six spots are awarded by the use of provisionals based on owner's points. The seventh is awarded to a past champion who has not otherwise qualified for the race. If no past champion needs the provisional, the next team in the owner points will be awarded a provisional.

Three drivers would fail to qualify: Dave Marcis, Brian Cunningham, and Larry Gunselman.

Full qualifying results 

*Time not available.

Race results

References 

NASCAR races at Watkins Glen International
August 1998 sports events in the United States
1998 NASCAR Winston Cup Series
1998 in sports in New York (state)